Hypericum japonicum, known as matted St. John's-wort, is an annual herbaceous flowering plant in the St. John's wort family Hypericaceae, in Hypericum sect. Trigynobrathys.

Description
The leaves are sessile and spreading and are persistent. The species is 30-flowered with flowers branching from up to three nodes. The species' stamens number 5–30 in irregular groups or in five groups when few in number.

The species flowers primarily from October-March.

Distribution
The species is found across the Indian subcontinent, China, Southeast Asia, and Oceania. It has been recorded as occurring in Hawaii, however it was determined that this was an error.

Full distribution listing

Reference

japonicum
Plants described in 1784